The Social Democratic Party "Harmony" (S), also commonly referred to as Harmony (Saskaņa), is a social-democratic political party in Latvia. It was the largest political party in the Saeima, representing the Russian minority of Latvia, before losing all of its parliamentary seats in the 2022 Latvian parliamentary election, and it is currently led by Jānis Urbanovičs.

It was founded in 2010 as the merger of the National Harmony Party (TSP) with New Centre (JC) and the Social Democratic Party (SDP), a breakaway from the Latvian Social Democratic Workers' Party (LSDSP). At the time, all three parties were a part of the Harmony Centre coalition, which was also made up of the Socialist Party of Latvia. The Daugavpils City Party merged into Harmony in 2011.

The former chairman of the party, Nils Ušakovs served as the Mayor of Riga from 2009 to 2019, and was Harmony's candidate for the office of Prime Minister of Latvia in 2014. Internationally, "Harmony" is a member of the Progressive Alliance and the Party of European Socialists. After the 2014 European Parliament election in Latvia, its sole MEP, Andrejs Mamikins, sat in the Progressive Alliance of Socialists and Democrats (S&D) group in the European Parliament. In 2018, after disagreements with Ušakovs, he defected to the Latvian Russian Union, and the party lost its representation in the European Parliament until the 2019 European Parliament election in Latvia, when Ušakovs and his ally, former Vice Mayor of Riga Andris Ameriks (a member of Honor to serve Riga) were elected. In the 2018 Latvian parliamentary election, Harmony won 23 seats, but in the subsequent 2022 Latvian parliamentary election it lost all its seats.

Harmony is positioned on the centre-left on the political spectrum, although it has taken conservative rhetoric regarding social issues, while its parliamentary membership is not uniformly socially conservative. It previously had ties with United Russia until 2017, when Harmony joined the Party of European Socialists. It is also a member of the Progressive Alliance. As of 2017, Harmony has 3,653 members, and its youth wing is "Restart.lv".

Election results

Legislative elections

European Parliament

References

External links
Official website 
Harmony: Latvian Democracy at Russia's Doorstep. May 8, 2019. Bertelsmann Foundation.

Political parties established in 2010
Social democratic parties in Latvia
2010 establishments in Latvia
Progressive Alliance
Parties related to the Party of European Socialists
Russian nationalism in Latvia
Russian political parties in Latvia
Russian minority interests parties